The 1804 presidential election in Georgia took place between November 2 to December 15, 1804, as part of the 1804 United States presidential election. As occurred at the time, the state legislatures chose six electors to represent the state in the election.

Results
Nationwide, Jefferson won in a landslide, winning all but two states and proving to be a very popular president in most areas. Georgia was no exception, with all six electors voting for Democratic-Republican candidate Thomas Jefferson and his running mate George Clinton, over the Federalist candidates Charles Pinckney and Rufus King.

See also
 United States presidential elections in Georgia
 1804 United States presidential election

Notes

References

1804 Georgia (U.S. state) elections
1804 United States presidential election
1804 United States presidential election by state
United States presidential elections in Georgia (U.S. state)